Radical Light is a single-movement orchestral composition by the American composer Steven Stucky.  The work was commissioned by the Los Angeles Philharmonic with contributions from Lenore and Bernard Greenberg.  It was premiered October 18, 2007 at the Walt Disney Concert Hall in Los Angeles, with conductor Esa-Pekka Salonen leading the Los Angeles Philharmonic.  The title of the piece comes from the poem "He Held Radical Light" by A. R. Ammons.

Composition
Stucky drew inspiration from the music of Jean Sibelius—specifically his Fourth and Seventh symphonies, beside which Radical Light was to be first performed.  Stucky wrote of this influence in the score program notes:
Despite this, Stucky nevertheless remarked that "the actual sound of the music has nothing to do with Sibelius".  The work is dedicated to cellist Elinor Frey.

Reception
Lisa Hirsch of the San Francisco Classical Voice lauded the work and noted the influence of Sibelius, remarking, "Stucky says that the direct influence is the structure of the one-movement Seventh Symphony. Radical Light is considerably shorter than that work, but builds organically to a spectacular climax of blazing brass and mad string figuration."  Joshua Kosman of the San Francisco Chronicle similarly praised the piece as "encompass[ing] a wealth of moods and orchestral colors" and wrote:

References

Compositions by Steven Stucky
2007 compositions
21st-century classical music
Compositions for symphony orchestra
Music commissioned by the Los Angeles Philharmonic